Charles Joseph Whitman (June 24, 1941 – August 1, 1966) was an American mass murderer who became known as the "Texas Tower Sniper". On August 1, 1966, Whitman used knives to kill his mother and his wife in their respective homes, then went to the University of Texas at Austin (UT Austin) with multiple firearms and began indiscriminately shooting at people. He fatally shot three people inside UT Austin's Main Building, then accessed the 28th-floor observation deck on the building's clock tower. There, he fired at random people for 96 minutes, killing an additional eleven people and wounding 31 others before he was shot dead by Austin police officers. Whitman killed a total of sixteen people; the 16th victim died 35 years later from injuries sustained in the attack.

Early life and education
Charles Whitman was born on June 24, 1941, in Lake Worth, Florida, the eldest of three sons born to Margaret E. ( Hodges) and Charles Adolphus Whitman Jr. Whitman's father was raised in an orphanage in Savannah, Georgia, and described himself as a self-made man. His wife, Margaret, was 17 years old at the time they wed. The marriage of Whitman's parents was marred by domestic violence; Whitman's father was an admitted authoritarian who provided for his family but demanded near perfection from all of them. He was known to be physically and emotionally abusive towards his wife and children.

As a boy, Whitman was described as a polite child who seldom lost his temper. He was extremely intelligent—an examination at the age of six revealed his IQ to be 139. Whitman's academic achievements were encouraged by his parents, and any indication of failure or a lethargic attitude were met with discipline—often physical—from his father.

Margaret was a devout Roman Catholic who raised her sons in the same denomination. The Whitman brothers regularly attended Mass with their mother, and all three brothers served as altar boys at the Sacred Heart Roman Catholic Church in Lake Worth.

Whitman's father was a firearms collector and enthusiast, who taught each of his young sons to shoot, clean, and maintain weapons. He regularly took them on hunting trips, and Charles became an avid hunter and accomplished marksman. His father said of him: "Charlie could plug the eye out of a squirrel by the time he was sixteen."

Whitman joined the Boy Scouts of America at age 11. He became an Eagle Scout at twelve years three months, reportedly the youngest of any Eagle Scout up to that time. Whitman also became an accomplished pianist at the age of 12. At around the same time, he began an extensive newspaper route.

High school

On September 1, 1955, Whitman entered St. Ann's High School in West Palm Beach, where he was regarded as a moderately popular student. By the next month, he had saved enough money from his newspaper route to purchase a Harley-Davidson motorcycle, which he used on his route.

Without telling his father beforehand, Whitman enlisted in the United States Marine Corps one month after his June 1959 graduation from high school, where he had graduated seventh in a class of 72 students. Whitman told a family friend that the catalyst for his enlistment was an incident a month earlier, in which his father had beaten him and thrown him into the family swimming pool because Whitman had come home drunk. Whitman left home on July 6, having been assigned an eighteen-month tour of duty with the Marines at Guantánamo Bay, Cuba. As Whitman traveled toward Parris Island, his father, who still had not known of Whitman's enlistment, learned of his action and telephoned a branch of the federal government trying to have his son's enlistment canceled.

U.S. Marine and college student
During Whitman's initial eighteen-month service in 1959 and 1960, he earned a sharpshooter's badge and the Marine Corps Expeditionary Medal. He achieved 215 of 250 possible points on marksmanship tests, doing well when shooting rapidly over long distances as well as at moving targets. (Although he was labeled a "sniper" in media accounts, Whitman was never an actual Sniper or close to being one. The Sharpshooter badge is attained fairly regularly and is 2nd to expert level in standard qualification.) After completing his assignment, Whitman applied for a scholarship to the Naval Enlisted Science and Education Program (NESEP), an initiative designed to send enlisted personnel to college to train as engineers, and after graduation, be commissioned as officers.

Whitman earned high scores on the required examination, and the selection committee approved his enrollment at a preparatory school in Maryland, where he completed courses in mathematics and physics before being approved to transfer to the University of Texas at Austin (UT Austin) to study mechanical engineering.

University life
On September 15, 1961, Whitman entered the mechanical engineering program at UT Austin. He was initially a poor student. His hobbies included karate, scuba diving, gambling, and hunting. Shortly after his enrollment at the university, Whitman and two friends were observed poaching a deer, with a passerby recording his license plate number and reporting them to the police. The trio were butchering the deer in the shower at Whitman's dormitory when they were arrested. Whitman was fined $100 ($ in ) for the offense.

Whitman earned a reputation as a practical joker in his years as an engineering student, but his friends also noted he made some morbid and chilling statements. In 1962, he remarked to a fellow student, "A person could stand off an army from atop of [the Main Building's clock tower] before they got him."

Marriage

In February 1962, 20-year-old Whitman met Kathleen Frances Leissner, an education major two years his junior. Leissner was Whitman's first serious girlfriend; he briefly dated actress Deanna Dunagan just prior to beginning his relationship with her. They courted for five months before announcing their engagement on July 19.

On August 17, 1962, Whitman and Leissner were married in a Catholic ceremony held in Leissner's hometown of Needville, Texas. The couple chose the 22nd wedding anniversary of Whitman's parents as the date for their wedding. Whitman's family drove from Florida to attend the event, and his younger brother Patrick served as best man. Fr. Leduc, a Whitman family friend, presided over the ceremony. Leissner's family and friends approved of her choice of husband, describing Whitman as a "handsome young man" who was both intelligent and aspirational.

Although Whitman's grades improved somewhat during his second and third semesters, the Marines considered them insufficient for continuation of his scholarship. He was ordered to active duty in February 1963 and went to Camp Lejeune in North Carolina, for the remainder of his five-year enlistment.

Camp Lejeune
Whitman apparently resented his college studies being ended, although he was automatically promoted to the rank of Lance Corporal. At Camp Lejeune, he was hospitalized for four days after single-handedly freeing another Marine by lifting a Jeep which had rolled over an embankment.

Despite his reputation as an exemplary Marine, Whitman continued to gamble. In November 1963, he was court-martialed for gambling, usury, possession of a personal firearm on base, and threatening another Marine over a $30 loan ($ in ) for which he had demanded $15 in interest. Sentenced to thirty days of confinement and ninety days of hard labor, he was demoted from lance corporal (E-3) to private (E-1).

Documented stressors

While awaiting his court-martial in 1963, Whitman began to write a diary titled Daily Record of C. J. Whitman. In it, he wrote about his daily life in the Marine Corps and his interactions with his wife and other family members. He also wrote about his upcoming court-martial and contempt for the Marine Corps, criticizing them for inefficiencies. In his writings about Leissner, Whitman often praised her and expressed his longing to be with her. He also wrote about his efforts and plans to free himself from financial dependence on his father.

In December 1964, Whitman was honorably discharged from the Marines. He returned to UT Austin, enrolling in the architectural engineering program. To support his wife and himself, he worked as a bill collector for the Standard Finance Company. Later, he worked as a bank teller at the Austin National Bank. In January 1965, Whitman took a temporary job with Central Freight Lines as a traffic surveyor for the Texas Highway Department, while his wife worked as a biology teacher at Lanier High School. He was also a volunteer scout leader with Austin Scout Troop 5.

Friends later said that Whitman had told them that he struck his wife on two occasions. They said that Whitman despised himself for this and confessed to being "mortally afraid of being like his father." In his journal, Whitman lamented his actions and resolved to be a good husband and not abusive as his father had been.

Separation of Whitman's parents
In May 1966, Whitman's mother announced her decision to divorce her husband because of his continued physical abuse. Whitman drove to Florida to help his mother move to Austin. He was reportedly so afraid that his father would resort to violence against his mother as she prepared to leave that he summoned a local policeman to remain outside the house while she packed her belongings. Whitman's youngest brother, John, also left Lake Worth and moved to Austin with his mother. Patrick Whitman, the middle son, remained in Florida and worked in his father's plumbing supply business.

In Austin, Whitman's mother took a job in a cafeteria and moved into her own apartment, though she remained in close contact with him. Whitman's father later said he had spent more than $1,000 ($ in ) on long-distance phone calls to both his wife and his son, begging his wife to return and asking his son to convince her to come back. During this stressful time, Whitman was abusing amphetamines and began experiencing severe headaches, which he described as being "tremendous".

Events leading to the shooting 

The day before the shootings, Whitman bought a pair of binoculars and a knife from a hardware store, and some Spam from a 7-Eleven convenience store. He picked up his wife from her summer job as a telephone operator before he met his mother for lunch at the Wyatt Cafeteria, which was close to the UT Austin campus.

At about 4:00 p.m. the same day, Whitman and his wife visited their close friends John and Frances Morgan. They left the Morgans' apartment at 5:50 p.m. so Kathy could get to her 6:00–10:00 p.m. shift.

At 6:45 p.m., Whitman began typing his suicide note, a portion of which read:

In his note, Whitman went on to request an autopsy be performed on his remains after he was dead to determine if there had been a discernible biological contributory cause for his actions and for his continuing and increasingly intense headaches. He also wrote that he had decided to kill both his mother and wife. Expressing uncertainty about his reasons, he nonetheless stated he did not believe his mother had "ever enjoyed life as she is entitled to", and that his wife had "been as fine a wife to me as any man could ever hope to have". Whitman further explained that he wanted to relieve both his wife and mother of the suffering of this world, and to save them the embarrassment of his actions. He did not mention planning the attack at the university.

Just after midnight on August 1, Whitman drove to his mother's apartment at 1212 Guadalupe Street. After killing his mother, he placed her body on her bed and covered it with sheets. How he murdered his mother is disputed, but officials believed he rendered her unconscious before stabbing her in the heart.

He left a handwritten note beside her body, which read in part:

Whitman then returned to his home at 906 Jewell Street, where he killed his wife by stabbing her five times in the chest as she slept. He covered her body with sheets, then resumed the typewritten note he had begun the previous evening. Using a ballpoint pen, he wrote at the side of the page:

Whitman continued the note, finishing it by pen:

Whitman also left instructions in the rented house requesting that two rolls of camera film be developed and wrote personal notes to each of his brothers. He last wrote on an envelope labeled "Thoughts for the Day", in which he stored a collection of written admonitions. He added on the outside of the envelope:

At 5:45 a.m. on August 1, 1966, Whitman phoned his wife's supervisor at Bell System to explain that Kathy was ill and unable to work that day. He made a similar phone call to his mother's workplace five hours later.

Whitman's final journal entries were written in the past tense, suggesting that he had already killed his wife and mother.

University of Texas Tower shooting

At approximately 11:35 a.m., Whitman arrived on the UT Austin campus. He falsely identified himself as a research assistant and told a security guard he was there to deliver equipment. He then climbed to the 28th floor of the Main Building's clock tower, killing three people within the tower, and opened fire from the observation deck with a hunting rifle and other weapons.

Whitman killed fourteen people and wounded 31 in the 96 minutes before he was shot and killed by Patrolman Houston McCoy of the Austin Police Department. He and Sergeant Ramiro Martinez had raced to the top of the tower to stop Whitman.

Death and inquest

Medical history
Investigating officers found that Whitman had visited several UT Austin physicians in the year before the shootings; they prescribed various medications for him. Whitman had seen a minimum of five doctors between the fall and winter of 1965 before he visited a psychiatrist from whom he received no prescription. At some other time he was prescribed Valium by Jan Cochrum, who recommended he visit the campus psychiatrist.

Whitman met with Maurice Dean Heatly, the staff psychiatrist at the University of Texas Health Center, on March 29, 1966. He referred to his visit with Heatly in his final suicide note, writing: "I talked with a Doctor once for about two hours and tried to convey to him my fears that I felt come  overwhelming violent impulses. After one visit, I never saw the Doctor again, and since then have been fighting my mental turmoil alone, and seemingly to no avail."

Heatly's notes on the visit said, "This massive, muscular youth seemed to be oozing with hostility [...] that something seemed to be happening to him and that he didn't seem to be himself." "He readily admits having overwhelming periods of hostility with a very minimum of provocation. Repeated inquiries attempting to analyze his exact experiences were not too successful with the exception of his vivid reference to 'thinking about going up on the tower with a deer rifle and start shooting people.

Autopsy
Although Whitman had been prescribed drugs and was in possession of Dexedrine at the time of his death, the toxicology was delayed because Whitman had been embalmed on August 1, after his body was brought to the Cook Funeral Home in Austin. However, an autopsy had been requested in the suicide notes left by Whitman and was then approved by his father.

On August 2, an autopsy was conducted by Coleman de Chenar (a neuropathologist at Austin State Hospital) at the funeral home. Urine and blood were removed to test for traces of amphetamines or other substances. During the autopsy, Chenar discovered a "pecan-sized" brain tumor, which he labeled an astrocytoma and which exhibited a small amount of necrosis. These findings were later revised by the Connally Commission: "It is the opinion of the task force that the relationship between the brain tumor and Charles J. Whitman's actions on the last day of his life cannot be established with clarity."

Connally Commission
John Connally, then governor of Texas, commissioned a task force to examine the autopsy findings and material related to Whitman's actions and motives. The commission was composed of neurosurgeons, psychiatrists, pathologists, psychologists, including the University of Texas Health Center Directors, John White and Maurice Heatly. The commission's toxicology tests revealed nothing significant. They examined Chenar's paraffin blocks of the brain tumor, stained specimens of it and Whitman's other brain tissue, in addition to the remainder of the autopsy specimens available.

Following a three-hour hearing on August 5, the commission concluded that Chenar's finding had been in error. They found that the tumor had features of a glioblastoma multiforme, with widespread areas of necrosis, palisading of cells, and a "remarkable vascular component" described as having "the nature of a small congenital vascular malformation". Psychiatric contributors to the report concluded that "the relationship between the brain tumor and [...] Whitman's actions [...] cannot be established with clarity. However, the [...] tumor conceivably could have contributed to his inability to control his emotions and actions", while the neurologists and neuropathologists concluded: "The application of existing knowledge of organic brain function does not enable us to explain the actions of Whitman on August first."

Forensic investigators have theorized that the tumor pressed against Whitman's amygdala, a part of the brain related to anxiety and fight-or-flight responses.

Funeral
A joint Catholic funeral service for Whitman and his mother was held in Lake Worth, Florida, on August 5, 1966. They were buried in Florida's Hillcrest Memorial Park. Since he was a military veteran, Whitman was buried with military honors; his casket was draped with the American flag. There was no mention of his wife's funeral.

See also

 List of disasters in the United States by death toll
 List of rampage killers (school massacres)
 The Deadly Tower
 Tower (2016 film)

References

Bibliography

External links
 
 
 
 Memorial website dedicated to those who were killed on August 1, 1966.
 Charles Whitman Research Guide at the Austin History Center
 

1941 births
1966 deaths
20th-century American criminals
American criminal snipers
American male criminals
American mass murderers
American spree killers
Burials in Florida
Crime in Texas
Criminals from Florida
Deaths by firearm in Texas
History of neuroscience
Male murderers
Military personnel from Florida
People from Lake Worth Beach, Florida
People shot dead by law enforcement officers in the United States
United States Marines
Cockrell School of Engineering alumni
Catholics from Florida
University of Texas tower shooting